The 2010 Hun Sen Cup was the 4th season of the Hun Sen Cup, the premier knockout tournament for association football clubs in Cambodia involving Cambodian League and provincial teams organized by the Football Federation of Cambodia.

Phnom Penh Crown were the defending champions, having beaten Nagacorp FC 1–0 in the previous season's final.

Group stage
The matches were arranged in four regions, with two groups in each region. The teams finishing in the top two positions in each of the eight groups in Group stage progressed to the Round of 16 in Phnom Penh.

Groups A and B in Battambang

Groups C and D in Siem Reap

Groups E and F in Kep

Groups G and H in Svay Rieng

Group A

Group B

Group C

Group D

Group E

Group F

Group G

Group H

Round of 16

Quarter-finals

Semi-finals

Third place play-off

Final

Awards
 Top goal scorers: Kouch Sokumpheak of Khemara Keila FC, Srey Veasna of Phnom Penh Crown FC (20 goals)
 Goalkeeper of the Season: Peng Bunchhay of Phnom Penh Crown FC
 Fair play: Preah Khan Reach

See also
 2010 Cambodian League
 Cambodian League
 Hun Sen Cup

References

Hun Sen Cup seasons
2010 in Cambodian football